Luikjärve farm is an affiliate to Obinitsa Museum in Meremäe rural municipality, in Tobrova village in Estonia; it is a typical Seto fortress-farm.

Obinitsa Museum consists of two parts - Obinitsa Seto Muuseumitarõ in Obinitsa village and Luikjärve farm, a seto fortress-farm that has been reconstructed 4 km from Obinitsa. Luikjärve farm will be opened as an experience farm. Until then, visitors can see the farm during the events held there and also when calling ahead.
The farm is situated on the 6th kilometre of Meremäe-Obinitsa road on the right, in Tobrova village, by Tuhkvitsa Stream. The farm got its water from Tuhkvitsa Stream. It is a typical example of the so-called fortress-farm in Setumaa. It is characterised by an enclosed yard made up from the buildings, high gates and fences. Tobrovo tsässon (small seto chapel) is also situated on the farm territory.

References

Setomaa Parish
Buildings and structures in Võru County
Museums in Estonia